Mesapamea secalella is a moth belonging to the family Noctuidae. The species was first described by X. Remm in 1983.

It is native to Europe.

References

Hadeninae